Bijoy Sankar Barman (born 1980) is an Indian poet, writer and translator who writes in Assamese language. He has been awarded with Yuva Puraskar by Sahitya Akademi

Barman was recognized by Indian Express as one of the ten ‘Best Young Writers’ of India in 2012.

Apart from English and all other constitutionalized regional languages in India, his poems have been translated into Italian, French, Spanish, Estonian etc. The Mexican-Spanish version of his poem has been broadcast by Radio UdeG. He participated in literary events abroad.

His poem has been included in Great Indian poems, a representative anthology of 3000 years of Indian poetry edited by poet-diplomat Abhay K.

Works
 His poetry book in Estonian translated by Mathura was published in 2016 as 'Pisarateoja Ketetong' meaning 'Streaming Tears of Ketetong'.
 He was the first one to translate the Tamil classic Kuruntokai to Assamese language. It was published as 'Kurundoheir Kabita' in 2014 in Assamese.
 'Ashokashtami' (published in 2011 won Sahitya Akademi Yuva Puraskar in 2013 for this poetry collection)
His poetry book in Bengali translated by Sanjay Chakraborty was published as 'Amar Angulgulir Ongkurodgam' in 2019 by Monfakira.
'Tug at the Gillnet', a poetry book of fifty three poems by Bijoy Sankar Barman translated into English by Nirendra Nath Thakuria was published by Halfcrow Publication House in 2021.

Awards
Munin Barkataki Award (2007)
 Sahitya Akademi's Yuva Puraskar (2013)
Sabda Yuva Sahitya Award (2018)

References

Assamese-language writers
Assamese-language poets
Living people
1980 births
Recipients of the Sahitya Akademi Yuva Puraskar